Christopher J. Jackman (July 12, 1916 – January 28, 1991) was an American Democratic Party politician from New Jersey, who served in both houses of the New Jersey Legislature. He was Speaker of the New Jersey General Assembly from 1978 until 1982.

Life and career
Jackman was born in New York City in 1916. He attended public schools in West New York, New Jersey and took labor classes at Rutgers University and Cornell University.  A longtime labor advocate, he became vice-president of the International Brotherhood of Pulp, Sulphite, and Paper Mill Workers and its successor, the United Paperworkers International Union. He sat on the executive board of the
New Jersey AFL-CIO.

Jackman was chairman of the West New York Housing Authority from 1952 to 1959. He was elected to the New Jersey General Assembly from Hudson County in 1967. He became majority leader in 1977 and speaker in 1978, serving in the latter position until 1982 when he was replaced by Alan Karcher. He was a delegate to the 1980 Democratic National Convention.

In 1983, Jackman was elected to the New Jersey Senate, following the conviction of William Musto on racketeering charges. He was reelected in 1987 and became deputy majority leader. In 1991 he died of cancer at The University Hospital in Newark, New Jersey. Bob Menendez, then serving in the Assembly, was appointed to fill the vacant seat in March 1991 and was elected to a full term the following November.

References

External links
Biographical information for Christopher J. Jackman from The Political Graveyard

|-

|-

|-

|-

|-

1916 births
1991 deaths
Cornell University School of Industrial and Labor Relations alumni
Democratic Party New Jersey state senators
Politicians from New York City
Politicians from Hudson County, New Jersey
People from West New York, New Jersey
Rutgers University alumni
Speakers of the New Jersey General Assembly
Democratic Party members of the New Jersey General Assembly
20th-century American politicians